Nordic Game Jam is an annual game jam that takes place in Copenhagen, created in 2006 by Gorm Lai and the Danish chapter of the International Game Developers Association in collaboration with Jesper Juul (the IT University of Copenhagen) and Henriette Moos (Diginet Øresund). It is one of the biggest videogame-related events in Denmark and one of the largest game jams in the world, with 900 participants as of 2016. Participants are given a theme or series of restrictions at the beginning of the event and are then given around 40 hours to make a game around those. In 2009 it served as the flagship game jam and inspiration for Global Game Jam.

Participants
Participants in the Nordic Game Jam come from several Nordic countries as well as other countries around the world. People of all skill levels and from various fields are welcome, such as game designers, programmers, sound designers, graphic artists or simply those interested in learning how to make games.

Before the jam begins, participants are given some time to meet and form teams, encouraging partnering with new people. Afterwards the theme and restrictions for that year are released and the countdown begins.

Past events

2006
The first Nordic Game Jam was held from January 27–29, 2006, at the IT University of Copenhagen. During the jam, 40 participants created 8 games in 48 hours.

2007
In February 2007 the number of participants doubled to 80 with a total of 12 games created.

2008
For 2008 the number of participants increased to the point of becoming the biggest game jam in the world at its time, with 150 participants and 19 games, including Dark Room Sex Game. The main theme for 2008 was "Taboo" and three constraints: the game had to loop, had to be playable with a controller and was required to be multiplayer.

2009
In 2009 Nordic Game Jam became the flagship for the Global Game Jam, which started that same year during the same time. Chairman of the IGDA Education Special Interest Group Susan Gold organized an initiative with Ian Schreiber and Gorm Lai to have game jams around the globe in the same way as the Nordic Game Jam and with Nordic Game Jam as flagship, inspiration and model. Heather Kelley was hosted as the keynote speaker. A total of 157 participants took part in the jam and made around 29 games.

2010
For 2010 Nordic Game Jam brought the at the time Microsoft Game Studios Creative Director Peter Molyneux as keynote speaker and member of the jury.

2011
In 2011 Greg Costikyan was the keynote speaker.

2012
For 2012 Senior Designer at BioWare Manveer Heir gave that year's keynote speech. A total of 350 participants attended that year.

2013
The 2013 edition of Nordic Game Jam however brought several changes. Besides taking place in a new venue (Aalborg University in Copenhagen), it was also moved one week ahead of the Global Game Jam, separating itself from the global competition to allow participants to go to both Nordic Game Jam and a Global Game Jam event elsewhere the week after. The keynote speakers were Dennaton and Vlambeer. The event attracted a total of 470 participants.

2014
In 2014, Nordic Game Jam took place at Aalborg University - Copenhagen again and had John Polson as the keynote speaker. The event had a total of 570 participants, and 110 games were created around the theme of privacy.

2015
In 2015, the Nordic Game Jam hosted Steve Swink as the Keynote Speaker. The jam grew to more than 700 people, and centered around the theme: Obvious. The winning game was called "The Wuuuuuuu" - as it was controlled only by shouting into a microphone, all the jammers played it together during the final presentations.

2016
The 2016 edition hosted over 900 participants and created 182 games. The Keynote speech was held by Kevin Martens & Jesse MacCree from Blizzard, the theme was "Leak" (and therefore, was revealed before the jam), and the winning game was "Random Access Murder". The jam again took place at the Aalborg University Copenhagen, but the Award Ceremony was moved to Imperial Cinema.

2017
In 2017 the jam changed the location - it took place at Docken, Copenhagen. On 21-23 April 2017, 700 participants created 144 
 games under a theme 'Not there'. The winner of the jam was "Baba Is You" by Hempuli. Kelly Wallick, Founder of Indie Megabooth, was the keynote speaker.

2018
In 2018 the jam changed location again - it took place at TAP1, Copenhagen. On 13-16 April 2018, 700 participants created 86  games under the theme 'Breaking Point'. The winner of the jam was "ON-LINE" by Peter Witt, Ronnie Vilhelmsen, Przemysław Krowiński, Jesper Helleskov Sørensen, Jens Peter Larsen, and Elie Abraham. The keynote was done by Robin Hunicke.

2019
In 2019, the Nordic Game Jam hosted Heather Kelley as the keynote speaker for a second time. It was held at KADK (The Royal Danish Academy of Fine Arts Schools of Architecture, Design and Conservation), Copenhagen.

2020
In 2020 the jam was again supposed to have been at KADK (The Royal Danish Academy of Fine Arts Schools of Architecture, Design and Conservation), Copenhagen.
But due to COVID-19, the jam was postponed.

An online jam was held during the original weekend.

References

Video game development
Game jams